Iain Hamilton may refer to:

Iain Hamilton (journalist) (1920–1986), editor at the Spectator
Iain Hamilton (composer) (1922–2000), Scottish composer

See also
Ian Hamilton (disambiguation)
Iain Douglas-Hamilton (born 1942), zoologist known for his study of elephants
Iain Hamilton Grant, British lecturer